Flaouna,, is a cheese-filled pastry from the island of Cyprus, which may include raisins or be garnished with sesame seeds. Flaounes are traditionally prepared for Easter by Orthodox Cypriots and during Ramadan by Turkish Cypriots. Regional names for flaouna include vlaouna, fesoudki (Greek:φεσούδκι) in Karavas, and aflaouna in Karpasia.

History
Flaounes are traditionally served in Cyprus as a celebratory food for the breaking of the Lenten fast, being prepared on Good Friday for consumption on Easter Sunday by Orthodox Christians. They are eaten in place of bread on Easter Sunday, and continue to be made and eaten for the weeks following. Creating the flaounes can often be a family tradition shared with multiple generations.

The Guinness World Records holds a record for the largest flaouna ever made. It was set on 11 April 2012 by the company Carrefour in Limassol. As part of the celebrations, 20 percent of sales of flaounes in Carrefour stores on the day in Cyprus went to charity.

Flaounes were featured as a technical challenge in The Great British Bake Off pastry week episode of season six.

The name Flaouna is derived from the ancient Greek παλάθη (paláthē> flado> fladoonis> flauna), a cake of preserved or dried fruit.

Recipe
Flaounes are a cheese-filled pastry interspersed with cheese. The pastry is described as similar to shortcrust in texture. The cheese can be a mix of graviera, halloumi, fresh anari or kefalotyri. Outside of Europe, these cheeses can sometimes be referred to as "flaouna" cheese. Flaounes may be served hot or cold. Depending on the area of the island in which they are made, the recipes vary so that the pastries are either salty, semi-sweet or sweet. They can also sometimes have sesame seeds sprinkled on top or sultanas interspersed with the cheese.

References

See also
Flaó
Fiadone

Easter food
Cypriot cuisine
Ramadan